Caulanthus crassicaulis is a species of flowering plant in the family Brassicaceae known by the common name thickstem wild cabbage. It is native to the western United States where it is a member of the flora in sagebrush, woodland, and desert scrub habitats. This is a perennial herb producing a stout, inflated stem from a woody caudex base. The leaves form a basal rosette and occur at intervals along the stem. They are broadly lance-shaped on the lower stem and much smaller and linear in shape farther up. They may have smooth, toothed, or deeply cut edges. The rounded flower has a coat of thick, pouched sepals which part at the flower tip to reveal narrow dark purple or brown petals. There are two varieties of this species: var. crassicaulis generally has hairy flowers, while var. glaber has hairless. The fruit is a long, thin silique which may approach 13 centimeters in length.

External links
Jepson Manual Treatment
USDA Plants Profile
CalPhotos photo gallery
NatureServe Explorer

crassicaulis
Flora of Arizona
Flora of California
Flora of Colorado
Flora of Idaho
Flora of Nevada
Flora of Utah
Flora of Wyoming
Flora of the California desert regions
Flora of the Great Basin
Plants described in 1852